Several Scottish mountains bear the name Beinn Tarsuinn including:
Beinn Tarsuinn (Munro) (937 m), a Munro
Beinn Tarsuinn (Corbett) (826 m), a Corbett on the Isle of Arran